The following is a timeline of the history of the city of Berlin, Germany.

Prior to 17th century

 1163 – Berlin founded by Albert the Bear (approximate date).
 1183 – Oak beam, discovered in 2008 by archaeologists, dated to 1183.
 1200 – Saint Peter's Church built in Cölln (approximate date).
 1220 – Population: 2,400.
 1230 
 St. Nicholas' Church built (approximate date).
 Tabor Church (Berlin-Hohenschönhausen) built (approximate date).
 1237 – 28 October: First documentation of Cölln.
 1240 – Marienfelde church built (approximate date).
 1244 – 29 April: First documentation of Berlin.
 1250 
 Population: 1,200–2,000.
 Jesus Church (Berlin-Kaulsdorf) built (approximate date).
 Franziskaner-Klosterkirche built (approximate date).
 Karow (Berlin) church built (approximate date).
 1253 – Oldest known town seal of Berlin.
 1272 – Bakers' guild established.
 1278 – Georgenhospital established.
 1282 – First documentation of official papers of the Margrave of Brandenburg.
 1292 – 3 January: St. Mary's Church in existence.
 1300 – Heinersdorf church construction begins.
 1307 
 20 March: Legal union of Berlin and Cölln.
 Population: 4,000–7,000.
 1360 – Berlin-Cölln joins the Hanseatic League.
 1380 – Fire.
 1400
 Population: 7,000–8,500.
 1,100 buildings.
 1432 – Merger of Berlin and Cölln.
 1433 –  (militia) formed.
 1442 – Berlin leaves the Hanseatic League.
 1443 – Stadtschloss (palace) construction begins.
 1446 – 7 December: Pogrom against Jews.
 1448 – 14 October: Unsuccessful protest against the construction of the Stadtschloss. Town privileges curtailed.
 1450 – Population: 7,000–8,000.
 1451 – Stadtschloss built.
 1454 – St. Erasmus Chapel consecrated.
 1468 – First documentation of Kammergericht.
 1484 – 18 October: Jerusalem Church in existence.
 1486 – 11 March: Berlin Stadtschloss becomes permanent seat of Brandenburg Electors.
 1510 – 100 Jews accused of desecrating hosts. 38 burned, the rest banished and stripped of their possessions.
 1530 – Tiergarten hunting park built.
 1539 – 1 November: Protestant Reformation.
 1540 
 Church possessions secularized.
 Printing press in operation.
 1542 – Kurfürstendamm avenue built.
 1543 – Jagdschloss Grunewald hunting lodge built.
 1558 – Köpenick Palace built.
 1576 
 Population: 11,000–12,000.
 Bubonic plague kills 6,000 people.
 1594 – Spandau Citadel built.

17th century
 1600 – Population: 9,000.
 1618 – Population: 12,000.
 1631 – Population: 8,100.
 1636 – Joachimsthalsches Gymnasium (school) relocates to Berlin.
 1647 – Unter den Linden boulevard laid out.
 1642 – Population: 7,500.
 1648 – Population: 6,000.
 1650 – Berlin Fortress construction begins.
 1653 – Alte Kommandantur built.
 1661 – Library of the Elector opened.
 1664 – Schönhausen Palace built.
 1669 – Kronprinzenpalais built.
 1671 – 21 May: 50 Jewish families from Austria settled in Berlin.
 1674 – Dorotheenstadt receives town privileges.
 1677 – Köpenick Palace rebuilt and enlarged.
 1678 – Dorotheen Church built.
 1680 – Population: 10,000.
 1685
 29 June: Börse Berlin stock exchange founded.
 6,000 Huguenots settle in Berlin.
 Wooden Neustädtische Brücke built.
 Population: 17,500.
 1688
 Gendarmenmarkt laid out.
 Jungfern Bridge built.
 Leipziger Straße (street) laid out.
 Population: 18,000–20,000.
 1690 – Hohenschönhausen Castle built.
 1691 – Friedrichstadt (Berlin) founded.
 1693 – Jagdschloss Glienicke completed.
 1695 
 21 July: Sebastiankirche opened.
 Friedrichsfelde Palace built.
 Lange-brucke (bridge) built.
 1696 – Academy of Arts founded.

18th century
 1700
 11 July: Electoral Brandenburg Society of Sciences founded.
 Population: 28,500.
 1701 – 18 January: Berlin becomes capital of the Kingdom of Prussia.
 1702 – Friedrichs-Waisenhaus Rummelsburg orphanage and infirmary established.
 1703 
 8 July: Parochialkirche opened.
 Wooden Friedrichs Bridge built.
 1704 – Vossische Zeitung founded.
 1705 
 Charlottenburg founded.
 French Cathedral built in Friedrichstadt.
 1706 – Zeughaus built.
 1708
 9 April: Neue Kirche completed in Friedrichstadt.
 Frankfurter Allee built.
 1709
 Berlin merges with the cities of Cölln, Dorotheenstadt, Friedrichstadt, and Friedrichswerder to create the capital and royal residence of Berlin.
 Population: 55,196.
 1710 – Charité hospital established.
 1712 – Population: 61,000.
 1713
 18 June: Spandauische Kirche inaugurated.
 Charlottenburg Palace built.
 Nicolaische Buchhandlung (bookseller) in business.
 1715 – City hosts Treaty of Berlin (1715).
 1716 – 12 July: Luisenkirche inaugurated.
 1717 – Compulsory schooling established.
 1720 – Späth nursery founded.
 1721 – Population: 65,300.
 1722 – Garrison Church built.
 1726 – Population: 72,000.
 1730 – Population: 72,387.
 1732 
 13 December: Treaty of the Three Black Eagles signed by Prussia.
 1,200 Bohemians settle in Berlin to escape religious persecution.
 Population: 77,973.
 Crown Prince's Palace remodelled.
 1733
 Prinzessinnenpalais built.
 Population: 79,017.
 1734 
 Potsdam Gate constructed.
 Pariser Platz laid out.
 Das Rondell laid out.
 1735 – Population: 86,000.
 1737 
 City fortifications replaced by the Berlin Customs Wall 
 Opera Palace constructed.
 Zietenplatz built.
 1738 – Ordenspalais built.
 1739 
 13 August: Holy Trinity Church built.
 Prinz-Albrecht-Palais built.
 1740 – Population: 90,000.
 1742
 28 July: City hosts signing of the Treaty of Berlin (1742).
 7 December: Berlin State Opera house inaugurated.
 1743 – Opernplatz (square) laid out.
 1746 – Population: 97,000.
 1747 – Population: 107,224.
 1748
 Berlin Cathedral built.
 Population: 107,635.
 1749 – Population: 110,933.
 1750 – Population: 113,289.
 1751
 22 September: Ackerstraße building begins.
 Population: 116,483.
 1752 – Population: 119,224.
 1753
 Palais am Festungsgraben built.
 Luisenstädtische Kirche rebuilt.
 Population: 122,897.
 1754 – Population: 125,385.
 1755 – Population: 126,661.
 1756 – Population: 99,224.
 1757
 16 October: 1757 raid on Berlin. Austrian general András Hadik raids Berlin.
 Population: 94,219.
 1758 – Population: 92,356.
 1759 – Population: 94,433.
 1760
 9–12 October: Raid on Berlin. City taken by Russian and Austrian forces.
 Population: 95,245.
 1761 – Population: 98,238.
 1762 – Population: 98,090.
 1763
 19 September: Royal Porcelain Factory, Berlin founded in Charlottenburg.
 Population: 119,219.
 1764
 Döbbelinsches Theater opened, the first permanent German-language theater in Berlin.
 Population: 122,667.
 1765
 Bank established.
 Population: 125,139.
 1766
 Ephraim Palace built in Nikolaiviertel.
 Population: 125,878.
 1767 – Population: 127,140.
 1768 – Population: 130,359.
 1769
 Brick Friedrichs Bridge built.
 Population: 132,365.
 1770
 Bergakademie Berlin established.
 Population: 133,520.
 1771 – Population: 133,639.
 1772 – Population: 131,126.
 1773
 1 November: St. Hedwig's Church consecrated.
 Population: 132,204.
 1774
 Französisches Komödienhaus established.
 Population: 134,414.
 1775 – Population: 136,137.
 1776 – Population: 137,468.
 1777 – Population: 140,719.
 1778 – Population: 124,963.
 1779 – Population: 138,225.
 1780
  (library) built.
 Population: 140,625.
 1781 – Population: 142,375.
 1782 – Population: 143,098.
 1783
 Wednesday Society active.
 Berlinische Monatsschrift (magazine) begins publication.
 Population: 144,224.
 1784 – Population: 145,021.
 1785 – Population: 146,647.
 1786
 Bellevue Palace built.
 Population: 147,338.
 1787 – Population: 146,167.
 1788 – Population: 149,274.
 1789 – Population: 149,875.
 1790 – Population: 150,803.
 1791 
 24 May: Sing-Akademie zu Berlin (choral society) founded.
 Brandenburg Gate dedicated.
 Population: 155,211.
 1792 – Population: 157,534.
 1793 – Population: 157,121.
 1794 – Population: 157,603.
 1795
 First steam engine in Berlin, used to power spinning machines.
 Population: 156,218.
 1796
 Zuckerbäckerei Johann Josty & Co. established.
 Population: 160,733.
 1797
 Pfaueninsel Palace built.
 Population: 164,978.
 1798 – Population: 169,019.
 1799
 18 March: Bauakademie founded.
 Population: 169,510.

19th century

1800s–1860s
 1800 – Population: 172,132.
 1801 – Population: 176,709.
 1802 – Population: 177,029.
 1803 – Population: 178,309.
 1804
 Royal Prussian Iron Foundry established.
 Population: 182,157.
 1805
 25 October: Alexanderplatz renamed in honor of Tsar Alexander I of Russia.
 Population: 155,706.
 1806 
 24 October: Berlin occupied by the French army.
 21 November: Napoleon issues Berlin Decree while passing through city.
 Population: 155,000.
 1807 – Population: 150,489.
 1808
 December: French occupation ends.
 Population: 145,941.
 1809 
 Elections to city council held.
 25 March: Berlin Police formed.
 4 November: Gesetzlose Gesellschaft zu Berlin founded.
 Population: 151,119.
 1810 
 15 October: University of Berlin established.
 Natural History Museum established as part of the University of Berlin.
 Population: 162,971.
 1811 – Population: 169,763.
 1812
 Café Josty in business (approximate date).
 Population: 171,000.
 1813 – Population: 178,641.
 1814 – Population: 185,659.
 1815 
 10 March: Nathan Israel Department Store established.
 City becomes part of the Province of Brandenburg.
 Population: 197,717.
 1816
 First continental European locomotive built at the Royal Prussian Iron Foundry.
 Population: 197,817.
 1817 – Population: 195,689.
 1818
 18 September: Neue Wache inaugurated.
 Population: 198,125.
 1819 – Population: 209,138.
 1820 – Population: 201,900.
 1821
 30 March: Prussian National Monument for the Liberation Wars opened.
 18 June: Schauspielhaus Berlin (theatre) inaugurated.
 Population: 205,965.
 1822 – Population: 209,146.
 1824
 29 February: Berlin Missionary Society constituted.
 Schlossbrücke rebuilt.
 1825
 1 December: Population: 220,277.
 Sing-Akademie building constructed.
 First horsebus line operational.
 1826 
 Glienicke Palace built.
 First gas lighting in Berlin at the Unter den Linden.
 Crelle's Journal founded.
 1827 – 29 April: Premiere of Mendelssohn's opera Hochzeit des Camacho.
 1828
 1 December: Population: 236,830.
 Berlin Geographical Society founded.
 1830 
 3 August: Königliches Museum opens.
 Museum Vaterländischer Altertümer formed.
 1831
 10 July: Friedrichswerder Church inaugurated.
 1 December: Population: 248,682.
 1834
 3 December: Population: 265,122.
 Café Kranzler in business.
 1835 – 24 April: Berlin Observatory opened.
 1837 
 13 August: Ss. Peter and Paul inaugurated.
 3 December: Population: 283,722.
 August Borsig founds Machine factory on Chausseestraße.
 Old Palace built.
 Schinkelplatz laid out.
 1838
 22 September: Berlin-Zehlendorf station opened.
 29 October: 
 first railway in Prussia, the Berlin–Potsdam railway opened.
 Berlin Potsdamer Bahnhof opened.
 Bote & Bock music publisher in business.
 1839 – 13 June: Berlin Rathaus Steglitz station opened.
 1840
 3 December: Population: 330,230.
 Zwei Friedenssäulen erected outside Charlottenburg Palace.
 1841 
 1 July:
 Berlin–Halle railway opened.
 Berlin Anhalter Bahnhof opened.
  (artists association) founded.
 1842 
 1 August: Bernau bei Berlin station opened.
 1 October: Stettiner Bahnhof opened.
 23 October: 
 Berlin–Wrocław railway opened.
 Frankfurter Bahnhof opened.
 Berlin-Friedrichshagen station opened.
 Berlin-Köpenick station opened.
 Johann Friedrich Ludwig Wöhlert opens locomotive factory at Chausseestrasse No. 29.
 Springer-Verlag (publisher) in business.
 1843
 3 December: Population: 353,149.
 Royal Opera House rebuilt.
 1844 
 Kroll Opera House opened.
 Berlin Zoological Garden opened.
 1845 
 14 January: Physical Society of Berlin established.
 Stadtschloss completed.
 1846 
 24 September: Discovery of Neptune planet at the Observatory.
 15 October:
 Berlin–Hamburg Railway opened.
 Berlin-Stresow station opened.
 Hamburger Bahnhof opened.
 Nauen station opened.
 3 December: Population: 408,502.
 15 December: Berlin–Hamburg Railway completed.
 1847
 April: Prussian parliament begins meeting in the Stadtschloss.
 1 October: Siemens founded.
 Stern Gesangverein founded.
 Neue Berliner Musikzeitung begins publishing.
 1848
 18 March: "Barricade fights." 303 civilians killed by Prussian troops. King Friedrich Wilhelm promises reforms.
 22 May: Elected assembly held.
 15 June: Political unrest.
 21 November: St. Marien am Behnitz consecrated.
 5 December: Elected assembly dissolved and monarchist constitution imposed.
 Falkensee station opened.
 1849
 3 December: Population: 423,902.
  built.
 Berliner Gummiwaarenfabrik founded.
 Wolffs Telegraphisches Bureau in business.
 1850
 31 January: Prussian House of Lords established.
 Berliner Musikschule (music school) founded.
 Friedrich-von-Raumer-Bibliothek founded.
 1851
 31 May: Equestrian statue of Frederick the Great inaugurated on Unter den Linden.
 15 October: Disconto-Gesellschaft founded.
 19 November: Corps Vandalia-Teutonia founded.
 Schering AG founded.
 1852
 3 October: Eisengießerei und Maschinen-Fabrik von L. Schwartzkopff founded.
 3 December: Population: 438,958.
 Luisenstadt Canal constructed.
 1853
 1 October: C. Bechstein Pianofortefabrik founded.
  delicatessen founded.
 Katholischer Studentenverein Askania-Burgundia Berlin established.
 1855
 3 December: Population: 447,483.
 Advertising columns installed in city.
 New Museum opens.
 1856 – J. F. Schwarzlose Söhne perfume maker founded.
 1857 – Berliner Entomologische Zeitschrift scientific journal founded.
 1858 – Population: 458,637.
 1859
 10 May: Alexander von Humboldt funeral.
 Berlin-Spandau Ship Canal opened.
 Charlottenburg Canal opened.
 1860 – Customs Wall removed.
 1861
 Moabit and Wedding become part of Berlin.
 Tiergarten locality established.
 Deutsche Allgemeine Zeitung begins publishing.
 28 October: St. Michael's Church consecrated.
 3 December: Population: 547,571.
 1862 – Berthold Kempinski wine shop in business.
 1863
 Photographers Association founded.
 Exchange built.
 Ed. Westermayer piano manufacturer founded.
  (publisher) in business.
 1864
 Wallner Theater built.
 3 December: Population: 632,749.
 1865 – 22 June: First horse-drawn tram line set up.
 1866
 27 February: Lette-Verein (women's educational organization) founded.
 7 May: Ferdinand Cohen-Blind's assassination attempt against Otto von Bismarck.
 5 September: New Synagogue consecrated.
 13 September: Berlin-Grünau station opened.
 Berlin–Görlitz railway opened.
 Westend (Berlin) locality established.
 1867 
 29 September: Friedrichstadt-Palast built.
 1 October: Berlin Old Ostbahnhof opened.
 3 December: Population: 702,437.
 1868
 24 May: Berlin-Schöneweide station opened.
 20 September: Berlin-Lichterfelde Ost station opened.
 City wall dismantled.
 Berliner Pfandbriefinstitut bank established.
 Palais Strousberg built.
 Biesdorf Palace built.
 Kunstgewerbemuseum Berlin established.
 1869
 25 August: Kaulsdorf station opened.
 3 October: Rotes Rathaus (city hall) opened.
 Royal School of Art in Berlin founded.
 St. Thomas inaugurated.

1870s–1890s
 1870 – 10 March: Deutsche Bank established.
 1871
 18 January: Berlin becomes capital of the newly unified German Empire.
 17 July: Berlin Ringbahn (railway) begins operating.
 1 December: Population: 826,341.
 Federal Institute for Materials Research and Testing founded.
 1872 
 1 January: 
 Berlin-Gesundbrunnen station opened.
 Berlin-Neukölln station opened.
 Berlin-Tempelhof station opened.
 1 May:
 Berlin Frankfurter Allee station opened.
 Berlin-Wedding station opened.
 15 December: Berlin-Lichterfelde West station opened.
 German Society of Surgery founded.
 Ludwig Loewe & Co. in business.
 Berlin-Lichterfelde West station built.
 1873
 2 September: Victory Column inaugurated on Königsplatz.
 Ethnological Museum of Berlin opened.
 1874
 1 June:
 Wannsee Railway opened.
 Berlin-Schlachtensee station opened.
 Berlin-Wannsee station opened.
 1 November: Berlin-Friedenau station opened.
 Fachschule für Dekomponieren, Komponieren und Musterzeichnen established.
 Twelve Apostels Church opened.
 1875
 1 February: Berlin Treptow station opened.
 1 May: Berlin Greifswalder Straße station opened.
 17 June:
 Berlin Dresdner Bahnhof opened.
 Marienfelde station opened.
 Rangsdorf railway station opened.
 15 October: Royal Prussian Military Railway opened.
 1 December: Population: 966,858.
 Socialist Workers' Party of Germany headquartered in Berlin.
 Hotel Kaiserhof in business.
 Königliche Hochschule für Musik active.
 1876
 1 January: Reichsbank established.
 1 April: Orenstein & Koppel founded.
 31 December: Population: 980,194.
 Imperial Health Agency established.
 National Gallery opens.
 Spandau Prison built.
 1877
 1 June: Berlin-Blankenburg station opened.
 10 July:
 Berlin-Hermsdorf station opened.
 Berlin-Schönholz station opened.
 Berlin-Wilhelmsruh station opened.
 Berlin-Wittenau station opened.
 Berlin Wollankstraße station opened.
 Berlin Old Nordbahnhof opened.
 15 November: 
 Berlin Ringbahn completed.
 Berlin-Halensee station opened.
 Berlin Hermannstraße station opened.
 Berlin-Westend station opened.
 Berlin Wuhlheide station opened.
 31 December: Population: 1,008,566.
 Wasserturm Prenzlauer Berg water tower completed.
 1878
 13 July: City hosts Congress of Berlin.
 Berlin Stadtbahn (city railway) begins operating.
 1879 
 1 April: Technical University of Berlin formed.
 15 May: Berlin-Rahnsdorf station opened.
 26 June: Berlin-Buch station opened.
 1 August:
 Berlin-Grunewald station opened.
 Berlin Schönhauser Allee station opened.
 1 September: Rangierbahnhof station opened.
 Imperial Treasury headquartered in city.
 Crown Prince Bridge built.
 Plötzensee Prison established.
 1880 
 15 June: New Berlin Anhalter Bahnhof opened.
 15 August: Südende station opened.
 9 September: Weißensee cemetery inaugurated.
 15 October: Berlin-Pankow station opened.
 1 December: Population: 1,122,330.
 Berlin movement initiated.
 Matthew Church (Berlin-Steglitz) built.
 1881
 29 April: Electromote presented.
 4 May: Berlin Storkower Straße station opened.
 16 May: Gross-Lichterfelde Tramway in service, the world's first electric tram line.
 15 October: Berlin Julius-Leber-Brücke station opened.
 Berlin administrative district separates from Province of Brandenburg.
 Martin-Gropius-Bau built.
 Berlin-Lichtenberg station opened.
 Zentralfriedhof Friedrichsfelde cemetery built.
 Städtischer Friedhof III cemetery built.
 Industrial museum established.
 1882 
 7 February:
 Berlin Stadtbahn (railway) begins operating.
 Berlin Alexanderplatz station opened.
 Berlin Bellevue station opened.
 Berlin-Charlottenburg station opened.
 Berlin Hackescher Markt station opened.
 Berlin Zoologischer Garten railway station opened.
 Berlin Jannowitzbrücke station opened.
 Berlin Friedrichstraße station opened
 Stralau-Rummelsburg station opened.
 1 May: Berlin Philharmonic established.
 15 November:
 Berlin-Karow station opened.
 Neu-Rahnsdorf station opened.
 Pestalozzi-Fröbel Haus founded.
 Berlin-Blankenheim railway opened.
 Kietz-Rummelsburg station opened.
 1883
 1 June: Lichtenrade station opened.
 15 December: Berlin Heidelberger Platz station opened.
 AEG founded.
 Berliner Lokal-Anzeiger founded.
 1884
 Dankeskirche (church) built.
 20 May: Berlin-Waidmannslust station opened.
 11 August: Berlin Warschauer Straße station opened.
 7 September: Dahlewitz railway station opened.
 15 November: City hosts West Africa Conference.
 1885
 5 January: Berlin-Tiergarten station opened.
 26 February: West Africa Conference concluded.
 1 August: Berlin-Biesdorf station opened.
 19 November: St. George's Anglican Church inaugurated.
 1 December: Population: 1,315,287.
 St. George's Anglican Church built.
 1886 – Ethnological museum established.
 1887
 German Colonial Society headquartered in Berlin.
  (bridge) and Heiligekreuzkirche (church) built.
 Society for Friends of Photography founded.
 1888
 3 March: Urania founded.
 15 April: BFC Germania 1888 founded.
 11 September: Lessing Theater opened.
 1889
 6 June: BFC Viktoria 1889 founded.
 14 June: Treaty of Berlin (1889) signed over Samoa.
 Museum of Natural History opens.
 Academic Alpine Club of Berlin formed.
 1890
 5 February: Allianz founded.
 20 May: Baumschulenweg station opened.
 1 December: Population: 1,578,794.
 May Day begins.
 Wittenbergplatz laid out.
 1891
 April: Moltke Bridge opened.
 1 July: Robert Koch Institute founded.
 1 October: Western Berlin Yorckstraße station opened.
 Oder–Spree Canal opened.
 Hotel Bristol in business.
 1892
 4 January: Berliner Illustrirte Zeitung begins publishing.
 1 May:
 Berlin Bundesplatz station opened.
 Berlin Prenzlauer Allee station opened.
 2 July: Berliner SV 1892 founded.
 25 July: Hertha BSC founded.
 24 September: Komische Oper Berlin opened.
 20 December: Wriezen Railway opened.
 Neues Theater opens.
 Luther Bridge opened.
 1893
 26 February: Gethsemane Church inaugurated.
 26 June: St. Sebastian opened.
 1 August: Lichterfelde Süd station opened.
 1 October: 
 First section of the Kremmen Railway opened.
 Berlin Alt-Reinickendorf station opened.
 Berlin Karl-Bonhoeffer-Nervenklinik station opened.
 Berlin-Pankow-Heinersdorf station opened.
 Schulzendorf railway station opened.
 Berlin-Tegel railway station opened.
 Hennigsdorf station opened.
 20 December: Second section of the Kremmen Railway opened.
 Department of Medical Microbiology (Schering AG) established.
 Mendelssohn Palace built.
 1894
 8 January: Adlershof station opened.
 1 May:
 Berlin Beusselstraße station opened.
 Berlin Jungfernheide station opened.
 1 October: Eichborndamm station opened.
 5 December: Reichstag building completed.
 Friedrichs Bridge completely rebuilt.
 Chapel of Reconciliation built.
 Ss. Constantine and Helena Church built.
 1895
 15 February: Attilastraße station opened.
 1 May:
 Berlin-Karlshorst station opened.
 Berlin Landsberger Allee station opened.
 1 September:
 Kaiser Wilhelm Memorial Church consecrated.
 Mahlsdorf railway station opened.
 15 September: Spandau Synagogue dedicated.
 1 December:
 Population: 1,677,304.
 Lankwitz station opened.
 13 December: Premiere of Mahler's Symphony No. 2.
 17 December: Berolina unveiled.
 Pan (magazine) begins publishing.
 1896
 Oberbaum Bridge rebuilt.
 1 May: Great Industrial Exposition of Berlin opened.
 8 June: Baumschulenweg–Neukölln link line opened.
 1 August: Berlin Savignyplatz station opened.
 September: Treptow Observatory opened.
 17 September: Weidendammer Bridge rebuilt.
 15 October: Great Industrial Exposition of Berlin closed.
 Messter Film in business.
 1897
 22 March: National Kaiser Wilhelm Monument unveiled.
 1 May: Heiligensee station opened.
 30 September: International Automobile Exhibition begins.
 Rot-Weiss Tennis Club founded.
 1898
 1 May:
 Ahrensfelde station opened.
 Berlin-Marzahn station opened.
 31 August: Population: 1,820,000.
 1 October: Berlin Westhafen station opened.
 15 October: Wriezen Railway completed.
 Jewel Palace (Berlin) built.
 Einkaufsgenossenschaft der Kolonialwarenhändler im Halleschen Torbezirk zu Berlin established.
 Berlin Secession (art group) founded.
 Café des Westens in business.
 1899
 18 March: Die Woche begins publishing.
 30 April: Kopenhagener Straße opened.
 2 December: Tripartite Convention signed, dividing Samoa into German and American spheres of influence.
  (museum) opens.

20th century

1900s–1945

 1900 
 15 August: Berlin-Staaken station opened.
 1 December: Population: 1,888,848.
 Berlin Automobile Association founded.
 Viktoria-Luise-Platz laid out.
 1901 
 Population: 1,901,567.
 18 January: Überbrettl cabaret opened.
 1 October: Teltow railway station opened.
 1 December:
 Anhalt Suburban Line opened.
 Berlin Papestraße station opened.
 Neuer Marstall built.
 Catholic Apostolic Church (Kreuzberg) opened.
 1902 
 15 February: 
 Berlin U-Bahn begins operating.
 Kottbusser Tor (Berlin U-Bahn) station opened.
 Möckernbrücke (Berlin U-Bahn) station opened.
 18 February: 
 Görlitzer Bahnhof (Berlin U-Bahn) station opened.
 Hallesches Tor (Berlin U-Bahn) station opened (U1 line).
 Berlin Potsdamer Platz station station opened.
 Berlin Potsdamer Platz station station opened.
 Schlesisches Tor (Berlin U-Bahn) station opened.
 11 March:
 Bülowstraße (Berlin U-Bahn) station opened.
 Nollendorfplatz (Berlin U-Bahn) station opened.
 Berlin Zoologischer Garten U-Bahn station opened.
 Wittenbergplatz (Berlin U-Bahn) station opened.
 1 May: Berlin-Nikolassee station opened.
 22 July: Capernaum Church completed.
 17 August: Warschauer Straße (Berlin U-Bahn) station opened.
 14 December: 
 Ernst-Reuter-Platz (Berlin U-Bahn) station opened.
 1903
 1 May: Western Berlin Yorckstraße station opened.
 27 May: Telefunken founded.
 1 October: Berlin-Friedrichsfelde Ost station opened.
  built.
 American Church in Berlin built.
 1904
 4 September: Rykestrasse Synagogue inaugurated.
 1 November: Zehlendorf-Beerenstraße station opened.
 Kaiser-Friedrich-Museum opens.
 Tietz department store in business on Alexanderplatz.
 1905
 27 February: Berlin Cathedral consecrated after rebuilding.
 20 May: Charlottenburg Town Hall opened.
 1 June: Siemensstadt-Fürstenbrunn station opened.
 20 December: Tabor Church consecrated.
 Neues Schauspielhaus built.
 Population: 2,040,148.
 1906 
 14 May: 
 Deutsche Oper (Berlin U-Bahn) station opened.
 Richard-Wagner-Platz (Berlin U-Bahn) station opened.
 2 June: Teltow Canal opened.
 23 September: Hackesche Höfe courtyard opened.
 8 November: Museum of East Asian Art founded.
 Britz Canal opened.
 Griebnitz Canal opened.
 Virchow Hospital opens in Moabit.
 1907
 1 January: Schiller Theater opened.
 17 February: Reformation Church consecrated.
 27 March: Kaufhaus des Westens established.
 16 November: Glienicke Bridge inaugurated.
 Hotel Fürstenhof built.
 Märkisches Museum built in Köllnischer Park.
 1908
 29 March:
 Kaiserdamm (Berlin U-Bahn) station opened.
 Sophie-Charlotte-Platz (Berlin U-Bahn) station opened.
 Theodor-Heuss-Platz (Berlin U-Bahn) station opened.
 2 April: Hotel Excelsior opened.
 1 October:
 Hausvogteiplatz (Berlin U-Bahn) station opened.
 Kaiserhof U-Bahn station opened.
 Spittelmarkt (Berlin U-Bahn) station opened.
 Stadtmitte (Berlin U-Bahn) U2 platform opened.
 Reichskanzlerplatz laid out.
 Charlottenburg Gate opened.
 Hotel Esplanade Berlin opened.
 Friedrichstraßenpassage shopping arcade built.
 Shot Ball Tower (Berlin) built.
 1909
 1 May: Berlin Botanischer Garten station opened.
 23 May: Rennbahn station opened.
 26 September: Johannisthal Air Field opened.
 1 November: Berlin Heerstraße station opened.
 AEG turbine factory built.
 Expressionist Der Neue Club founded.
 1910
 April: Liebermann Villa completed.
 1 May: Berlin-Frohnau station opened.
 24 May: Berlin-Dahlem Botanical Garden and Botanical Museum opened.
 15 July: Berlin-Spandau station opened.
 7 August: Last horse-drawn tram line closed.
 17 November: Hohenzollern-Sport-Palast opened.
 1 November: Berlin Hohenzollerndamm station opened.
 1 December: 
 Population: 2,071,257.
 Bayerischer Platz (Berlin U-Bahn) station opened.
 Berlin Innsbrucker Platz station station opened.
 Rathaus Schöneberg (Berlin U-Bahn) station opened.
 Viktoria-Luise-Platz (Berlin U-Bahn) station opened.
 Berlin Hohenzollerndamm station built.
 Rathaus Schöneberg (Berlin U-Bahn) opened.
 Der Sturm magazine begins publication.
 1911
 9 April: Tabor Church (Berlin-Wilhelmshagen) consecrated.
 5 September: Berlin-Pichelsberg railway station opened.
 1 October: Berlin Sonnenallee station opened.
 29 October: Altes Stadthaus inaugurated.
 31 December: Population: 2,084,045.
 Kaiser Wilhelm Society for the Advancement of Sciences founded.
 Kaiser Wilhelm Institute for Physical Chemistry and Electrochemistry founded.
 Hotel Esplanade built.
 Haus Cumberland built.
 Spandau Suburban Line opened.
 Die Aktion magazine begins publication.
 1912
 February: Haus Potsdam built.
 26 August: Fasanenstrasse Synagogue opened.
 22 September: Mater Dolorosa church consecrated.
 3 November: Gleisdreieck (Berlin U-Bahn) station opened.
 7 November: Deutsche Oper Berlin opened.
 31 December: Population: 2,095,030.
 1913 
 8 June: 
 Deutsches Stadion (Berlin) opened.
 Stadion U-Bahn station opened.
 15 June: Märchenbrunnen opened.
 1 July: 
 Berlin Alexanderplatz station U-Bahn line U2 opened.
 Klosterstraße (Berlin U-Bahn) station opened.
 Märkisches Museum (Berlin U-Bahn) station opened.
 27 July:
 Eberswalder Straße (Berlin U-Bahn) station opened.
 Schönhauser Tor U-Bahn station opened.
 Berlin Schönhauser Allee station station opened.
 Senefelderplatz (Berlin U-Bahn) station opened.
 12 October:
 Breitenbachplatz (Berlin U-Bahn) station opened.
 Dahlem-Dorf (Berlin U-Bahn) station opened.
 Fehrbelliner Platz (Berlin U-Bahn) station opened.
 Berlin Heidelberger Platz U-Bahn station opened.
 Hohenzollernplatz (Berlin U-Bahn) station opened.
 Podbielskiallee (Berlin U-Bahn) station opened.
 Rüdesheimer Platz (Berlin U-Bahn) station opened.
 Freie Universität (Thielplatz) (Berlin U-Bahn) station opened.
 Thielpalatz U-Bahn station opened.
 17 October: Johannisthal air disaster.
 31 December: Population: 2,079,156.
 Cines-Palast (cinema) opened.
 Neukölln Ship Canal opened.
 Schillerpark opened.
 1914
 25 March: Rathaus Schöneberg opened.
 31 December: Population: 1,945,684.
 Volksbühne (theatre) and Bendlerblock built.
 Pacifist  headquartered in city.
 1915 – 31 December: Population: 1,835,094.
 1916
 1 April: Witzleben station opened.
 19 November: Deulig Film company established.
 1 December: Population: 1,771,491.
 Schleusen Bridge rebuilt.
 Eiserne Bridge rebuilt.
 Körnerpark opened.
 1917
 22 November: Standardisation Committee of German Industry founded.
 5 December: Population: 1,744,085.
 13 December: Deutsche Luft-Reederei founded.
 18 December: UFA GmbH established.
 Rathaus Friedenau built.
 1918 
 9 November: 
 Proclamation of the Republic by Philipp Scheidemann from the Reichstag building.
 Die Rote Fahne newspaper begins publication.
 23 December: The Volksmarinedivision occupies the Reich Chancellery.
 24 December: Skirmish of the Berlin Schloss.
 31 December: Population: 1,748,000.
 1919
 1 January: Communist Party of Germany founded.
 5–12 January: Spartacist uprising.
 15 January: Socialists Rosa Luxemburg and Karl Liebknecht killed by Freikorps.
 February: Dadaist Jedermann sein eigner Fussball published.
 3–16 March: Berlin March Battles: Socialist uprising crushed by the government, 1,200 killed.
 10 March: Marxist revolutionary Leo Jogiches killed by right-wing paramilitaries.
 May: Premiere of LGBT-themed film Anders als die Andern.
 22 June: Prizyv begins publishing.
 6 July: Institut für Sexualwissenschaft opened.
 8 October: Population: 1,902,508.
 7 November: SPD politician Hugo Haase killed by Johann Voss.
 31 December: Population: 1,928,432.
 City becomes capital of the Weimar Republic.
 Deutsche Luft-Reederei airline begins operating its Weimar-Berlin route.
 1920
 February: Berlin Psychoanalytic Institute established.
 13–17 March: Kapp Putsch.
 June: First International Dada Fair held.
 20 June: SC Berliner Amateure founded.
 7 August: Stadion An der Alten Försterei opened.
 16 August: Köllnische Heide station opened.
 1 October: City area expands per Greater Berlin Act, incorporating Charlottenburg, Köpenick, Lichtenberg, Neukölln, Schöneberg, Spandau, and Wilmersdorf.
 October: Deutsche Hochschule für Politik founded.
 31 December: Population: 3,879,409.
 Lokomotiv-Versuchsamt Grunewald facility established.
 Akaflieg Berlin founded.
 1921
 15 March: Assassination of Talat Pasha  by Soghomon Tehlirian.
 25 August: U.S.–German Peace Treaty (1921) signed.
 24 September: AVUS established.
 31 December: Population: 3,914,151.
 Archenhold School built.
 1922
 28 March: Assassination of Vladimir Dmitrievich Nabokov by Russian monarchists.
 17 April: Cemal Azmi assassinated by Armenian revolutionaries.
 27 April: Release of the first part of Dr. Mabuse the Gambler by Fritz Lang, filmed and set in Berlin.
 22 May: Neu-Westend (Berlin U-Bahn) station opened.
 24 June: Foreign Minister Walther Rathenau assassinated.
 December: International of Revolutionary Syndicalists founded in Berlin.
 31 December: Population: 3,953,920.
 1923 
 30 January:
 Französische Straße (Berlin U-Bahn) station opened.
 Berlin Friedrichstraße U-Bahn station opened.
 Hallesches Tor U6 line opened.
 Kochstraße (Berlin U-Bahn) station opened.
 Oranienburger Tor (Berlin U-Bahn) station opened.
 Naturkundemuseum (Berlin U-Bahn) station opened.
 Stadtmitte (Berlin U-Bahn) U6 platform opened.
 8 March:
 Leopoldplatz (Berlin U-Bahn) station opened.
 Reinickendorfer Straße (Berlin U-Bahn) station opened.
 Schwartzkopffstraße (Berlin U-Bahn) station opened.
 Seestraße (Berlin U-Bahn) station opened.
 Berlin-Wedding U-Bahn station opened.
 25 August: Last horsebus run in Berlin.
 8 October: Tempelhof Airport established.
 31 December: Population: 3,918,985.
 1924
 9 February: Stadion am Gesundbrunnen opened.
 19 April:
 Mehringdamm (Berlin U-Bahn) station opened.
 Gneisenaustraße (Berlin U-Bahn) station opened.
 31 May: Bank of Workers, Employees, and Civil Servants established.
 7 July: Stadt und Land founded.
 14 December: Südstern (Berlin U-Bahn) station opened.
 31 December: Population: 3,986,458.
 Traffic light installed in Potsdamer Platz.
 Internationale Funkausstellung Berlin (radio exhibit) begins.
 Berlin Radio Symphony Orchestra active.
 1925
 1 February: Deutsche Werke formed.
 26 April: Ahmadiyya Mosque Berlin inaugurated.
 16 June: Population: 4,024,286.
 31 December: Population: 4,082,778.
 Hufeisensiedlung housing estate construction begins.
 1926 
 6 January: Deutsche Luft Hansa founded.
 14 February: Kreuzberg U-Bahn station opened.
 11 April: 
 Hermannplatz (Berlin U-Bahn) U7 platform opened.
 Bergstrasse U-Bahn station opened.
 Rathaus Neukölln (Berlin U-Bahn) station opened.
 24 April: Treaty of Berlin (1926) signed with the Soviet Union.
 3 September: Funkturm Berlin (radio tower) erected.
 24 October: 
 Kurfürstenstraße (Berlin U-Bahn) station opened.
 Nollendorfplatz U-Bahn station platforms added.
 31 December: Population: 4,125,824.
 Das Buddhistische Haus built.
 1927
 10 January: Premiere of film Metropolis.
 4 July: Der Angriff begins publishing.
 17 July:
 U8 (Berlin U-Bahn) line opened.
 Boddinstraße (Berlin U-Bahn) station opened.
 Hermannplatz (Berlin U-Bahn) U8 platform opened.
 Schönleinstraße (Berlin U-Bahn) station opened.
 10 September: Paradestraße (Berlin U-Bahn) station opened.
 17 November: Betriebshaltepunkt Nieder-Schöneweide station opened.
 31 December: Population: 4,195,725.
 Tempelhof Airport terminal built.
 Kaiser Wilhelm Institute of Anthropology, Human Heredity, and Eugenics founded.
 1928
 12 February: Kottbusser Tor U-Bahn station U8 platform opened.
 6 April: 
 Neanderstraße U-Bahn station opened.
 Moritzplatz (Berlin U-Bahn) station opened.
 23 August: Berlin Eichkamp station opened.
 31 August: Premiere of Brecht's The Threepenny Opera.
 1 October: Founding of NSDAP Gau Berlin.
 7 October: Priesterweg station opened.
 10 December: Berlin Westkreuz station opened.
 31 December: Population: 4,272,375.
 First TV broadcast in Berlin.
 Titania Palast (theatre) opens.
 1929
 11 April: Kino Babylon opened.
 1–3 May: Blutmai unrest. 32 killed, 1,228 arrested and 11,000 rounds of ammunition fired by the police.
 28 May: Poststadion opened.
 4 August: Leinestraße (Berlin U-Bahn) station opened.
 22 December: 
 Krumme Lanke (Berlin U-Bahn) station opened.
 Onkel Toms Hütte (Berlin U-Bahn) station opened.
 Oskar-Helene-Heim (Berlin U-Bahn) station opened.
 Ruhleben (Berlin U-Bahn) station opened.
 Berlin-Tempelhof U-Bahn station opened.
 25 December: Lichtburg cinema opens.
 31 December: Population: 4,328,760.
 Charlotten Bridge rebuilt.
 Spandauer Kirchenmusikschule established.
 1930
 18 April:
 Berlin Alexanderplatz station U-Bahn line U8 opened.
 Bernauer Straße (Berlin U-Bahn) station opened.
 Berlin-Gesundbrunnen U-Bahn station opened.
 Berlin Jannowitzbrücke U-Bahn station opened.
 Rosenthaler Platz (Berlin U-Bahn) station opened.
 Voltastraße (Berlin U-Bahn) station opened.
 Weinmeisterstraße (Berlin U-Bahn) station opened.
 29 June: Vinetastraße (Berlin U-Bahn) station opened.
 13 August: Roman Catholic Archdiocese of Berlin established.
 17 August: Mommsenstadion opened.
 30 September: Berlin rocket launching site opened.
 21 December: 
 Berlin Alexanderplatz station U-Bahn line U8 opened.
 Frankfurter Allee (Berlin U-Bahn) station opened.
 Frankfurter Tor (Berlin U-Bahn) station opened.
 Friedrichsfelde (Berlin U-Bahn) station opened.
 Grenzallee (Berlin U-Bahn) station opened.
 Neukölln (Berlin U-Bahn) station opened.
 Magdalenenstraße (Berlin U-Bahn) station opened.
 Berlin-Lichtenberg station U-Bahn station opened.
 Samariterstraße (Berlin U-Bahn) station opened.
 Schillingstraße (Berlin U-Bahn) station opened.
 Strausberger Platz (Berlin U-Bahn) station opened.
 Weberwiese (Berlin U-Bahn) station opened.
 31 December: Population: 4,332,834.
 Pergamon Museum built.
 1931
 22 January: Haus des Rundfunks inaugurated.
 9 August: Murder of Paul Anlauf and Franz Lenck. 
 31 December: Population: 4,314,466.
 Großsiedlung Siemensstadt housing built.
 1932
 24 January: Hitler Youth member Herbert Norkus killed by Communists.
 14–20 March: Ice Hockey European Championship 1932.
 3–7 November: 1932 Berlin transport strike.
 31 December: Population: 4,273,701.
 Columbushaus built on Potsdamer Platz.
 1933
 Nazi headquarters relocated to Berlin from Munich.
 30 January: Hitler named Chancellor.
 27 February: Reichstag fire.
 19 March: Kirche am Hohenzollernplatz inaugurated.
 April: Research Office of the Reich Air Ministry established.
 26 April: Nazi Gestapo (secret police) headquartered in Berlin, on Prinz-Albrecht-Straße.
 6 May: Institut für Sexualwissenschaft destroyed by the German Student Union.
 10 May: Nazi book burnings in Opernplatz.
 6 June: Afghan ambassador to Germany, Prince Shirdar Mohammed Aziz Khan, assassinated by an Afghan student.
 16 June: Population: 4,242,501.
 21–26 June: Köpenick's week of bloodshed.
 1 July: Berlin Innsbrucker Platz station opened.
 July: Columbia concentration camp established.
 19 September: Ufa-Palast am Zoo premiere of the Hitlerjunge Quex, the first major Nazi propaganda film.
 22 September: Reich Chamber of Culture established.
 31 December: Population: 4,221,024.
 City becomes capital of the Greater German Reich.
 Hufeisensiedlung housing built.
 Strength Through Joy national leisure programme headquartered in Berlin.
 1934
 30 June – 2 July: Night of the Long Knives.
 Kurt von Schleicher, Ferdinand von Bredow, Gregor Strasser, Erich Klausener, Edgar Jung, Herbert von Bose, Karl Ernst and Karl-Günther Heimsoth killed.
 1 July: Berlin Sundgauer Straße station opened.
 27 September: Ferdowsi millennial celebration in Berlin.
 31 December: Population: 4,218,332.
 City becomes seat of the Greater Berlin and Mark Brandenburg Gaue (Nazi administrative divisions).
 1935
 31 January: Berlin Humboldthain station opened.
 22 March: First TV broadcasting service in the world in operation.
 28 March: Premiere of the film Triumph of the Will.
 1 October: Berlin Bornholmer Straße station opened.
 29 November: Deutschlandhalle inaugurated.
 31 December: Population: 4,226,584.
 Olympiapark Schwimmstadion Berlin built.
 Nazi SS-Hauptamt headquartered in Berlin, on Prinz-Albrecht-Straße.
 1936
 January: Gosen Canal opened.
 1 April: Luftkriegsschule 2 Berlin-Gatow staff and technical college opened.
 28 May:
 Berlin Nord-Süd Tunnel opened.
 Berlin Oranienburger Straße station opened.
 July: Sachsenhausen concentration camp established near the city.
 16 July: Berlin-Marzahn concentration camp established.
 27 July: Berlin Brandenburger Tor station opened.
 1 August: Olympic Stadium opened.
 1–16 August: 1936 Summer Olympics held.
 2 August: Waldbühne amphitheater opened.
 August: Air Ministry Building completed.
 31 December: Population: 4,267,560.
 Bundesautobahn 9 from Berlin to Munich opened.
 Vorbunker built.
 1937
 5 January: Julius Lippert becomes mayor.
 30 January: Albert Speer becomes  for the Reich capital.
 28 May: Volkswagen auto company founded.
 31 December: Population: 4,314,432.
 700th anniversary of the city celebrated.
 Messe Berlin built.
 1938
 20 April: Olympia (1938 film) released.
 29 April: DEST founded.
 9–10 November: Kristallnacht; Fasanenstrasse Synagogue and Spandau Synagogue burned.
 31 December: Population: 4,347,875.
 Schwimmhalle Finckensteinallee opened.
 Helicopter flight demonstrated.
 Elektro-Mess-Technik founded.
 1939 
 10 January: New Reich Chancellery completed.
 15 April: Berlin Potsdamer Platz station opened.
 20 April: Adolf Hitler's 50th birthday.
 17 May: Population: 4,338,756.
 1 September: German declaration of war against Poland.
 31 December: Population: 4,330,640.
 1940
 1 January: Altglienicke station opened.
 July: Ludwig Steeg becomes mayor.
 25 August: Bombing of Berlin in World War II begins.
 31 December: Population: 4,330,810.
 Reichsbank extension (Haus am Werderschen Markt) built.
 Telefunkenwerk Zehlendorf built.
 1941 
 14 October: Deportation of Jews to the east ordered by Kurt Daluege.
 11 December: German declaration of war against the United States.
 31 December: Population: 4,383,882.
 Tempelhof Airport terminal built.
 Zoo Tower built.
 1942 
 20 January: Wannsee Conference.
 31 December: Population: 4,478,102.
 Schwerbelastungskörper built.
 1943 
 28 January: Mass deportation of Jews to Auschwitz concentration camp ordered.
 February–March: Rosenstrasse protest.
 18 February: Proclamation of Total War in the Sportpalast speech by Joseph Goebbels.
 1 April: Berlin Albrechtshof station opened.
 18 November: Battle of Berlin (RAF campaign) begins.
 31 December: Population: 4,430,204.
 Bunker (Berlin) air raid shelter built.
 1944 
 31 March: RAF bombing campaign ends.
 21 July: Execution of 20 July plot conspirators.
 23 October: Führerbunker completed.
 31 December: Population: 4,361,398.
 1945
 16 April: Battle of Berlin begins.
 20 April: Operation Clausewitz begins.
 22 April: Panzerbär begins publishing.
 23 April: Battle in Berlin begins.
 24 April: Red Army encirclement of Berlin complete.
 30 April: Death of Adolf Hitler in the Führerbunker.
 1 May: Suicides of Joseph and Magda Goebbels.
 2 May:
 Red Army capture of the Reichstag building.
 Battle of Berlin ends.
 Nikolai Berzarin becomes commander of the Soviet sector of city.
 8 May: Ceremonial German Instrument of Surrender signed in Karlshorst.
 21 May: Berliner Zeitung begins publishing.
 Spring–summer: Mass rape of 100,000 German women by the Red Army.
 5 June: Berlin Declaration (1945).
 13 June: Deutsche Volkszeitung begins publishing.
 4 July: Floyd L. Parks becomes commander of the U.S. sector of city.
 5 July: Lewis Lyne becomes commander of the British sector of city.
 7 July: Das Volk begins publishing.
 11 July: Geoffroi du Bois de Beauchesne becomes commander of the French sector of city.
 17 July-2 August: Potsdam Conference held.
 21 July: Victory Parade.
 12 August: Population: 2,807,405.
 30 August: Allied Control Council constituted.
 12 December: Berlin Air Safety Center established.
 31 December: Population: 3,064,629.

1946–1989

 1946
 15 May: Buckower Chaussee station opened.
 October: City election held.
 29 October: Population: 3,170,832.
 31 December: Population: 3,213,966.
 Berlin Schönefeld Airport opened.
 1947
 8 February: Karlslust dance hall fire.
 Ernst Reuter becomes mayor.
 31 December: Population: 3,271,179.
 1948
 5 April: 1948 Gatow air disaster.
 24 June: Soviet blockade begins.
 26 June: Allied airlift of supplies begins.
 4 December: Free University of Berlin established.
 31 December: Population: 3,312,307.
 Berlin Tegel Airport opened.
 Kampfgruppe gegen Unmenschlichkeit formed.
 Handelsorganisation grocery opens in East Berlin.
 1949
 12 May: Berlin Blockade ends.
 November: Berliner Ensemble founded.
 8 December: Supreme Court of East Germany set up.
 31 December: Population: 3,328,193.
 City divided into East Berlin and West Berlin.
 East Berlin becomes capital of the German Democratic Republic.
 1950
 18 January: Marienfelde refugee transit camp opened.
 29 April: Liebknecht Bridge opened.
 20 May: Walter-Ulbricht-Stadion opened.
 31 December: Population: 3,336,026.
 Werner-Seelenbinder-Halle opened.
 Academy of Arts established in East Berlin.
 Freedom Bell installed in city hall of West Berlin.
 1951
 11 January: Landtag (parliament) of West Berlin established.
 6–17 June: Berlin International Film Festival begins in West Berlin.
 27 July: Ernst Thälmann Pioneer Park opened.
 3 August: Stalin Statue (Berlin) dedicated.
 31 December: Population: 3,351,865.
 East Berlin hosts 3rd World Festival of Youth and Students.
 Berliner Festspiele established in West Berlin.
 1952 
 Deutsche Waggon und Maschinenfabrik in business.
 1 May: Hochhaus an der Weberwiese completed.
 20 February: Knaack club opened.
 1 October: Friedrich-Ludwig-Jahn-Sportpark opened.
 31 December: Population: 3,374,178.
 1953 
 June: Uprising in East Berlin.
 31 December: Population: 3,367,406.
 1954
 25 January – 18 February: Berlin Conference (1954) held.
 10 September: Amerika-Gedenkbibliothek opened.
 31 December: Population: 3,350,957.
 Academy of Arts established in West Berlin.
 SC Dynamo Berlin founded.
 1955
 2 July: Tierpark Berlin opened.
 31 December: Population: 3,343,182.
 Radrennbahn Weissensee cycling track opened.
 1956 
 3 May:
 Afrikanische Straße (Berlin U-Bahn) station opened.
 Kurt-Schumacher-Platz (Berlin U-Bahn) station opened.
 Rehberge (Berlin U-Bahn) station opened.
 3 June: Plänterwald railway station opened.
 31 December: Population: 3,345,650.
 Westhafen Canal opened.
 Rotes Rathaus reconstructed; becomes city hall of East Berlin.
 1957
 31 December: Population: 3,338,561.
 International Building Exposition held.
 Haus der Kulturen der Welt built in West Berlin.
 1958
 31 May:
 Alt-Tegel (Berlin U-Bahn) station opened.
 Borsigwerke (Berlin U-Bahn) station opened.
 Holzhauser Straße (Berlin U-Bahn) station opened.
 Otisstraße (Berlin U-Bahn) station opened.
 Scharnweberstraße (Berlin U-Bahn) station opened.
 31 December: Population: 3,316,353.
 Bundesautobahn 100 opened.
 1959
 2 June: Spichernstraße (Berlin U-Bahn) station opened.
 31 December: Population: 3,290,333.
 Institute for European Politics founded in West Berlin.
 Jüdisches Gemeindehaus Fasanenstraße (Jewish centre) inaugurated in West Berlin.
 1960 
 31 December: Population: 3,274,016.
 Gropiusstadt developed.
 1961
 28 January: Birkenstraße (Berlin U-Bahn) station opened.
 8 May: Augsburger Straße (Berlin U-Bahn) station opened.
 4 June: Berlin Crisis of 1961 begins.
 13–15 August: Berlin Wall construction begins between East Berlin and West Berlin.
 19–20 August: U.S. vice president Lyndon B. Johnson visits West Berlin
 28 August:
 Amrumer Straße (Berlin U-Bahn) station opened.
 Hansaplatz (Berlin U-Bahn) station opened.
 Kurfürstendamm (Berlin U-Bahn) station opened.
 Leopoldplatz U9 platform opened.
 Spichernstraße U9 platform opened.
 Turmstraße (Berlin U-Bahn) station opened.
 Berlin Westhafen station station opened.
 Berlin Zoologischer Garten U9 platform opened.
 27–28 October: U.S.–Soviet confrontation at Checkpoint Charlie.
 31 December: Population: 3,252,691.
 Max Planck Institute for Human Development established.
 Ampelmännchen pedestrian signal introduced in East Berlin.
 1962
 27 May: Grünbergallee station opened.
 17 August: Killing of Peter Fechter at the Berlin Wall by East German border guards.
 31 December: Population: 3,235,231.
 1963
 5 May: Maria Regina Martyrum consecrated.
 26 June: U.S. president Kennedy gives Ich bin ein Berliner speech in West Berlin.
 28 September:
 Blaschkoallee (Berlin U-Bahn) station opened.
 Parchimer Allee (Berlin U-Bahn) station opened.
 29 September: Britz-Süd (Berlin U-Bahn) station opened.
 15 October: Berliner Philharmonie opened.
 15 November: Kino International opened.
 31 December: Population: 3,251,489.
 Berliner Philharmonie (concert hall) built in West Berlin.
 Berliner Singakademie founded in East Berlin.
 Hotel Berolina opened.
 Wellblechpalast opened.
 Biotronik founded.
 1964 
 18 July: Fernmeldeturm Berlin in service.
 31 December: Population: 3,270,959.
 Old Palace rebuilt.
 Prinzessinnenpalais rebuilt.
 JazzFest Berlin begins in West Berlin.
 1965 
 2 April: Europa-Center inaugurated.
 31 December: Population: 3,274,500.
 1966
 28 February:
 Alt-Mariendorf (Berlin U-Bahn) station opened.
 Alt-Tempelhof (Berlin U-Bahn) station opened.
 Kaiserin-Augusta-Straße (Berlin U-Bahn) station opened.
 Möckernbrücke U7 platform opened.
 Ullsteinstraße (Berlin U-Bahn) station opened.
 Westphalweg (Berlin U-Bahn) station opened.
 May: Zentraler Omnibusbahnhof Berlin opened.
 17 September: Deutsche Film- und Fernsehakademie Berlin founded.
 31 December: Population: 3,265,398.
 Prussian Heritage Image Archive established.
 1967
 2 June: Death of Benno Ohnesorg.
 15 September: Brücke Museum opened.
 31 December: Population: 3,245,325.
 Strausberger Platz built.
 Sister city relationship established with Los Angeles, USA.
 1968
 11 April: Josef Bachmann's assassination attempt against Rudi Dutschke.
 31 December: Population: 3,225,354.
 New National Gallery opens in West Berlin.
 1969
 30 September: World Clock (Alexanderplatz) opened.
 3 October: Fernsehturm Berlin (TV tower) erected in East Berlin.
 31 December: Population: 3,218,112.
 Neuer Berliner Kunstverein founded.
 Kulturpark Plänterwald opened.
 1970
 2 January:
 Johannisthaler Chaussee (Berlin U-Bahn) station opened.
 Lipschitzallee (Berlin U-Bahn) station opened.
 Wutzkyallee (Berlin U-Bahn) station opened.
 Zwickauer Damm (Berlin U-Bahn) station opened.
 7 October: Hotel Stadt Berlin built in East Berlin.
 31 December: Population: 3,208,719.
 Protestant Church of Plötzensee inaugurated.
 1971
 29 January:
 Bayerischer Platz U7 platform opened.
 Berliner Straße (Berlin U-Bahn) station opened.
 Blissestraße (Berlin U-Bahn) station opened.
 Berlin Bundesplatz U-Bahn station opened
 Eisenacher Straße station opened
 Fehrbelliner Platz U7 platform opened.
 Friedrich-Wilhelm-Platz (Berlin U-Bahn) station opened.
 Güntzelstraße (Berlin U-Bahn) station opened.
 Kleistpark (Berlin U-Bahn) station opened.
 Walther-Schreiber-Platz (Berlin U-Bahn) station opened.
 Berlin Yorckstraße U7 platform opened.
 4 December: Georg von Rauch shot and killed during arrest by West Berlin police.
 31 December: Population: 3,172,902.
 2 June Movement anarchist group active in West Berlin.
 1972
 15 May: Memorial to Polish Soldiers and German Anti-Fascists dedicated.
 3 June: Four Power Agreement on Berlin in force.
 1 July: Rudow (Berlin U-Bahn) station opened.
 21 December: Basic Treaty, 1972 signed.
 31 December: Population: 3,152,489.
 Kunstbibliothek Berlin opened.
 1973
 25 June: Tierpark (Berlin U-Bahn) station opened.
 31 December: Population: 3,136,776.
 Großgaststätte Ahornblatt (restaurant) built in East Berlin.
 1974
 30 September:
 Berlin Rathaus Steglitz U-Bahn station opened.
 Schloßstraße (Berlin U-Bahn) station opened.
 13 October: Berlin Marathon begins in West Berlin.
 31 December: Population: 3,118,134.
 1975
 31 December: Population: 3,083,011.
 Berlinische Galerie opened.
 Hochschule der Künste Berlin (art school) formed.
 Peter Lorenz becomes president of the Landtag of West Berlin.
 1976
 23 April: Palace of the Republic inaugurated.
 30 April:
 Nauener Platz (Berlin U-Bahn) station opened.
 Osloer Straße (Berlin U-Bahn) U9 station opened.
 13 October: Bierpinsel opened.
 30 December: Berlin Springpfuhl station opened.
 31 December: Population: 3,056,973.
 1977
 5 October:
 Osloer Straße U8 platform opened.
 Pankstraße (Berlin U-Bahn) station opened.
 31 December: Population: 3,044,968.
 1978
 28 April:
 Adenauerplatz (Berlin U-Bahn) station opened.
 Bismarckstraße (Berlin U-Bahn) station opened.
 Konstanzer Straße (Berlin U-Bahn) station opened.
 Wilmersdorfer Straße (Berlin U-Bahn) station opened.
 July: Air Berlin established.
 31 December: Population: 3,038,689.
 Berlin Motor Show begins in West Berlin.
 Berlin State Library building opens on Haus Potsdamer Straße in West Berlin.
 1979
 5 March: BESSY founded.
 2 April: Internationales Congress Centrum Berlin opened.
 31 December: Population: 3,042,504.
 Teufel company founded.
 1980
 1 May: Tempodrom opened.
 1 October:
 Halemweg (Berlin U-Bahn) station opened.
 Jakob-Kaiser-Platz (Berlin U-Bahn) station opened.
 Berlin Jungfernheide U7 station opened.
 Mierendorffplatz (Berlin U-Bahn) station opened.
 Rohrdamm (Berlin U-Bahn) station opened.
 Siemensdamm (Berlin U-Bahn) station opened.
  founded.
 Memorial to the German Resistance erected.
 15 December:
 Mehrower Allee station opened.
 Raoul-Wallenberg-Straße station opened.
 31 December: Population: 3,048,759.
 1981
 20 November: Western entrance to Teltow Canal reopened.
 31 December: Population: 3,050,974.
 AG Märkische Kleinbahn established.
 1982
 15 January: 1982 Berlin restaurant bombing.
 31 December: Population: 3,042,612.
 1983
 12 August: Weltkugelbrunnen opened.
 25 August: Bombing of French consulate in West Berlin.
 26 September: IAV founded.
 31 December: Population: 3,040,035.
 German Museum of Technology opened.
  founded.
 1984
 9 February: Eberhard Diepgen becomes mayor of West Berlin.
 1 October:
 Altstadt Spandau (Berlin U-Bahn) station opened.
 Haselhorst (Berlin U-Bahn) station opened.
 Paulsternstraße (Berlin U-Bahn) station opened.
 Rathaus Spandau (Berlin U-Bahn) station opened.
 Zitadelle (Berlin U-Bahn) station opened.
 20 December: Berlin-Hohenschönhausen station opened.
 31 December: Population: 3,045,456.
 1985
 31 December: Population: 3,075,670.
 West Berlin hosts Bundesgartenschau (garden show).
 ESCP Europe school moves to Berlin.
 1986
 1 January: Deutsches Herzzentrum Berlin opened.
 5 April: West Berlin discotheque bombing.
 31 December: Population: 3,115,473.
 1987
 750th anniversary of founding of Berlin celebrated.
 Topography of Terror exhibit opens.
 27 April:
 Franz-Neumann-Platz (Berlin U-Bahn) station opened.
 Paracelsus-Bad (Berlin U-Bahn) station opened.
 Residenzstraße (Berlin U-Bahn) station opened.
 1 May: May Day in Kreuzberg begins.
 12 June: U.S. president Reagan gives Tear down this wall! speech in West Berlin.
 31 December: Population: 3,273,630.
 1988
 31 March – 2 April: Four Nations Tournament (1988).
 1 July:
 Biesdorf-Süd (Berlin U-Bahn) station opened.
 Elsterwerdaer Platz (Berlin U-Bahn) station opened.
 31 December: Population: 3,352,848.
 West Berlin designated a European Capital of Culture.
 1988 IMF/World Bank protests.
 Metropol Verlag founded.
 1989
 Population: 1,279,212 in East Berlin.
 1 July:
 Cottbusser Platz (Berlin U-Bahn) station opened.
 Hellersdorf (Berlin U-Bahn) station opened.
 Hönow (Berlin U-Bahn) station opened.
 Kaulsdorf-Nord (Berlin U-Bahn) station opened.
 Louis-Lewin-Straße (Berlin U-Bahn) station opened.
 Kienberg (Gärten der Welt) (Berlin U-Bahn) station opened.
 Berlin Wuhletal station opened.
 7 October: Demonstrations in East Berlin.
 4 November: Alexanderplatz demonstration in East Berlin.
 9 November: Berlin Wall opened between East Berlin and West Berlin.
 31 December: Population: 3,409,737.

1990s
 1990
 13 June: Demolition of the Berlin wall begins.
 1 August: Most roads between West and East Berlin rebuilt and reopened.
 28 September: East Side Gallery opened.
 3 October: German reunification; unified Berlin designated capital of the Federal Republic of Germany.
 7 November: Stasi Museum opened.
 1 December: Schichauweg railway station opened.
 31 December: Population: 3,433,695.
 Federal Commissioner for the Stasi Records and  headquartered in Berlin.
 Kunsthaus Tacheles established.
 1991
 20 June: Decision on the Capital of Germany.
 4 July: Alba Berlin founded.
 31 December: Population: 3,446,031.
 1992 
 1 January: Weierstrass Institute established.
 17 September: Mykonos restaurant assassinations.
 31 December: Population: 3,456,891.
 A-Trane club opened.
 1993
 1 October: West and East Berlin Academy of Arts merged.
 31 December: Population: 3,461,421.
 Max Planck Institute for Infection Biology established.
 Berlin Cathedral renovated.
 Transparency International headquartered in city.
 Magix founded.
 Japanische Internationale Schule zu Berlin established.
 1994 
 March: Max Planck Institute for the History of Science established.
 26 April: Berlin-Bonn Act.
 9 September: Russian and Allied forces depart.
 24 September:
 Berlin Karl-Bonhoeffer-Nervenklinik U-Bahn station opened.
 Lindauer Allee (Berlin U-Bahn) station opened.
 Rathaus Reinickendorf (Berlin U-Bahn) station opened.
 Berlin-Wittenau U-Bahn station opened.
 31 December: Population: 3,452,284.
 Berlin-Hohenschönhausen Memorial opened.
 Berlin British School founded.
 1995
 17 January: Die Pyramide completed.
 10 May: German-Russian Museum opens.
 June: Artist Christo wraps the Reichstag.
 31 December: Population: 3,446,039.
 Berlin Central and Regional Library opened.
 1996
 13 July: Berlin Hermannstraße U-Bahn station opened.
 13 December: Max-Schmeling-Halle opened.
 31 December: Population: 3,428,644.
 Crown Prince Bridge rebuilt.
 City website online (approximate date).
 Berggruen Museum and  open.
 1997
 5 September: Velodrom arena opened.
 December: Propeller Island City Lodge founded.
 31 December: Population: 3,387,901.
 Computer Games Museum founded.
 1998 
 20 May: Treptowers opened.
 12 June: Gemäldegalerie opened.
 25 September: Osdorfer Straße station opened.
 2 October: Mendelssohn-Bartholdy-Park (Berlin U-Bahn) station opened.
 31 December: Population: 3,358,235.
 Allied Museum opened.
 1999
 17 February: 1999 Israeli consulate attack in Berlin.
 19 April: German Bundestag (legislature) relocated to Berlin from Bonn per Berlin-Bonn Act.
 31 December: Population: 3,340,887.
 Molecule Man (sculpture) installed in the Spree River.
 Clocktower reinstalled on Potsdamer Platz.
 2000
 14 June: Sony Center opened.
 31 December: Population: 3,331,232.
 Bahntower built.

21st century
 2001
 February: Anhalter Steg bridge built.
 2 May: Federal Chancellery (Berlin) completed.
 16 June: Klaus Wowereit becomes governing mayor.
 9 September: Jewish Museum, Berlin opened.
 21 October: Berlin state election, 2001.
 31 December: Population: 3,337,232.
 Merger of boroughs: Charlottenburg-Wilmersdorf, Friedrichshain-Kreuzberg, Marzahn-Hellersdorf, Steglitz-Zehlendorf, Tempelhof-Schöneberg, and Treptow-Köpenick formed.
 DZ Bank building constructed.
 Jewish Museum opens.
 Berlin International Literature Festival begins.
 2002
 31 December: Population: 3,336,248.
 SRH Hochschule Berlin established.
 Berlin Philharmonic Chamber Orchestra founded.
 Exberliner English-language magazine founded.
 2003
 2 December: AquaDom opened.
 31 December: Population: 3,330,242.
 2004 
 1 January: Federal Joint Committee health agency established.
 May: Badeschiff opened.
 3 June: Museum of Photography, Berlin opened.
 9 December: University Library of the TU Berlin and UdK opened.
 31 December: Population: 3,333,108.
 Festival of Lights begins.
 2005
 7 February: Honor killing of Hatun Sürücü.
 24 February: Berlin-Lichterfelde Süd–Teltow Stadt railway opened.
 10 May: Memorial to the Murdered Jews of Europe unveiled.
 30 June: Gustav Heinemann Bridge opened.
 31 December: Population: 3,339,436.
 Philological Library opened.
 Transradio founded.
 2006
 February: Institute for Media and Communication Policy.
 26 May: Berlin Hauptbahnhof (Central station) constructed.
 27 May: Berlin North–South mainline opened.
 9 July: FIFA World Cup Final held at Olympiastadion.
 15 July: DDR Museum opened.
 17 September: Berlin state election, 2006.
 31 December: Population: 3,348,805.
  nursing home established.
 2007 
 July: Berlin Fashion Week first held.
 12 September: Alexa Centre shopping mall opened.
 31 December: Population: 3,353,858.
 Rocket Internet founded.
 2008
 July: Scharf-Gerstenberg Collection opened.
 10 September: Mercedes-Benz Arena (Berlin) opened.
 1 October: BMG Rights Management founded.
 October: Zalando founded.
 16 October: Khadija Mosque opened.
 31 December: Population: 3,362,843.
 2009
 8 August:
 U55 (Berlin U-Bahn) line opened.
 Bundestag (Berlin U-Bahn) station opened.
 Berlin Hauptbahnhof U55 platforms opened.
 15–23 August: 2009 World Championships in Athletics held.
 16 October: Neues Museum reopened.
 31 December: Population: 3,369,672.
 International Psychoanalytic University Berlin founded.
  (garden) created.
 2010 – 31 December: Population: 3,387,562.
 2011
 29 June: Humboldt Box opened.
 18 September: Berlin state election, 2011.
 15 October: Occupy Berlin.
 31 December: Population: 3,427,114.
 2012 
 March: Zoofenster high-rise completed.
 27 September: Rathaus Bridge inaugurated after rebuilding.
 31 December: Population: 3,469,621.
 2013
 21 March: 2013 Berlin helicopter crash.
 2 June: Hohenzollern Stadtschloss (palace) reconstruction begins.
 3 November: Berlin energy referendum, 2013 held.
 15 November: Museum in the Kulturbrauerei opened.
 31 December: Population: 3,517,424.
 N26 (bank) founded.
 2014 
 March: .berlin internet domain name begins.
 28 August: 2014 Conference of Western Balkan States, Berlin held.
 25 September: Mall of Berlin opened.
 31 December: Population: 3,562,166.
 Headquarters of the Federal Intelligence Service built.
 2015
 7 February: Victoria released.
 31 December: Population: 3,610,156.
 2016
 July: Protest against gentrification in Friedrichshain.
 18 September: Berlin state election, 2016.
 1 December: Berlin Police Academy established.
 19 December: 2016 Berlin truck attack.
 31 December: Population: 3,670,622.
 2017
 13 April: IGA Cable Car opened.
 13 October: Babylon Berlin TV series released.
 10 December: Berlin–Munich high-speed railway opened.
 31 December: Population: 3,711,930.
 Urban Nation museum opens.
 2018 – 31 December: Population: 3,748,148.
 2022 - 8 June - 2022 Berlin car attack.

See also

 History of Berlin
 List of governing mayors of Berlin

References

This article incorporates information from the German Wikipedia.

Bibliography

Published in 17th-19th centuries
  1652/1680
 
 
 
 
 
 
 
 
 
 
 
 ; famous guidebook
 
  + v.2

Published in 20th century
in English
 
 
 
 
 
 
 
 
 
 
 
 
 
 
 
 
 
 
 

in German

Published in 21st century
 
 
 
 
 
 
 

 
 
  (about Berlin, Budapest, Prague, Warsaw)

External links

 
 Links to fulltext city directories for Berlin via Wikisource
 Europeana. Items related to Berlin, various dates.
 Digital Public Library of America. Items related to Berlin, various dates
 

Berlin-related lists
 Timeline
Berlin
Berlin
Years in Germany